Greatest Hits 1970–2002 is a career-spanning compilation album of popular songs by English musician Elton John, released on UTV Records in 2002. It debuted on the Billboard 200 chart at number 12 on 30 November 2002, for a total run of 67 weeks. It was certified gold and platinum in December 2002, double platinum in March 2003, triple platinum in August 2004, four- and five-times platinum simultaneously in February 2011, and 6× platinum in April 2016 by the RIAA.

It was the first Elton John compilation released since PolyGram, which had controlled the pre-1976 Elton John catalog, was sold to Universal Music Group, which controlled the post-1976 recordings. Before 1992, rights to John's music had been complicated as they shifted between various companies. UMG now owns worldwide distribution rights to all of John's music, while sharing overall ownership with John himself. It was configured differently for the American and European markets, and also available in a three-compact disc version in addition to the standard two-disc version. It contains every song released on the first two greatest hits packages released respectively in 1974 and 1977, with the exceptions of "Border Song" on Greatest Hits; "Grow Some Funk of Your Own", "Lucy in the Sky with Diamonds", and "Pinball Wizard" from Greatest Hits Vol. II, as well as "Levon" on the European version. All of those excepting for "Grow Some Funk of Your Own" are available on the bonus disc to the European edition.

In 2004, the album was reissued with the 2003 UK number 1 hit "Are You Ready for Love" as the final track on the second disc, replacing "Song for Guy". "Kiss the Bride" was also omitted to make room for the remake of "Sorry Seems to Be the Hardest Word" featuring the boy band Blue. The two newer hits are appended at the end of the third disc for the expanded editions, leaving the second disc tracklisting intact.

Track listing
All songs written by Elton John and Bernie Taupin unless otherwise noted.

European release

North American release

Charts

Weekly charts

Year-end charts

Certifications

References

2002 greatest hits albums
Elton John compilation albums
UTV Records compilation albums